The Mohammed Bin Rashid Space Centre (MBRSC), is a Dubai government organisation working on the UAE space programme, which includes various space satellite projects, the Emirates Mars Mission, the Emirates Lunar Mission, and the UAE astronaut programme. The centre actively works to promote space science and research in the region. The centre encompasses the Emirates Institution for Advanced Science and Technology (EIAST).

Overview 
Mohammed bin Rashid Al Maktoum, Vice President and Prime Minister of the United Arab Emirates and Ruler of Dubai, established The Emirates Institution for Advanced Science and Technology (EIAST) on 6 February 2006. On 17 April 2015, the Mohammed bin Rashid Space Centre was created, incorporating EIAST into it.

MBRSC contributes towards the development of various sectors within the United Arab Emirates and across the globe, using data from UAE satellites and various applications related to space science. The centre is at the forefront of promoting space science and scientific research in the UAE and the region. MBRSC also provides support to various organisations in the management of natural disasters, rescue missions, environmental monitoring and land planning using Earth imagery sent back from UAE satellites, including DubaiSat-1 and DubaiSat-2.

Creation
To establish a research and knowledge-based economy in the United Arab Emirates, Mohammed bin Rashid Al Maktoum issued a law in 2015 to establish the Mohammed bin Rashid Space Centre. MBRSC was tasked to support the country's efforts in the field of space; to supervise the design, manufacturing and launch of Al Amal Sukumaran, or "Hope" probe, the Arab world's first Mars probe; and to build an integrated infrastructure for manufacturing satellites and taking advantage of their various applications.

Mohammed bin Rashid Al Maktoum issued a decree to appoint Hamdan bin Mohammed Al Maktoum, Crown Prince of Dubai, as chairman and general supervisor of the strategic plans and projects of MBRSC in June 2015.

Along with the establishment of the Mohammed bin Rashid Space Centre, Sheikh Mohammed also issued a law to join the Emirates Institution for Advanced Science and Technology (EIAST) with the centre and consider it one of its affiliated institutions. As part of the law, EIAST will implement and follow up the policies, plans and decisions set by the Mohammed bin Rashid Space Centre. The board of directors of the Mohammed bin Rashid Space Centre were appointed, including Hamad Obaid Al Sheikh Al Mansouri as chairman of the board, Yousef Ahmed Al Shaibani as vice chairman, with Mansour Abdullah Bastaki, Mohammed Saif Al Miqbali and Mansoor Juma Bu Osaiba appointed as members.

The centre has works to promote space technology and scientific research in the region through innovative space projects and programmes.

Projects
The Mohammed bin Rashid Space Centre works across four main areas in order to achieve the goals and objectives set forth for the development of the space industry in the region: research and development of outer space, satellite manufacturing and systems development, Earth observation through satellite imagery, and ground station services to support other satellites.

The first satellite, DubaiSat-1, was launched on 29 July 2009 from the Baikonur launch site in Kazakhstan and since then, the centre has been building on its expertise to manufacture satellites with advanced technology for better research and development.

DubaiSat-1

DubaiSat-1 is an earth observation satellite, and was the first ever satellite launched by the Mohammed bin Rashid Space Centre. The DubaiSat-1 project was carried out in an agreement with Satrec Initiative, a satellite manufacturing company based in South Korea. It was designed and developed by Satrec Initiative, with participation of Emirati engineers from MBRSC.

DubaiSat-1 was launched on 29 July 2009 from the Baikonur launch site in Kazakhstan, aboard a Dnepr launch vehicle. With a diameter of around 1.2 metres and a height of 1.35 metres, the satellite has a deck-and-longeron type structure, allowing easy assembly and disassembly. DubaiSat-1 weighs less than 200 kg including a 50 kg payload mass, and its average power consumption is less than 150 watts.

DubaiSat-1 moves at a Low Earth orbit (LEO) and generates high-resolution optical images at 2.5 m in panchromatic and at 5 m in multispectral bands. These images are used by various governmental and private organisations within the United Arab Emirates and across the globe. The satellite imagery from DubaiSat-1 is used for a wide range of applications including infrastructure development, urban planning, and environment monitoring and protection. DubaiSat-1 images are also useful for promoting geosciences and remote sensing research in the region, and for supporting different scientific disciplines in private and academic sectors.

Images from DubaiSat-1 have been used to monitor the overall development of mega projects like the Palm Islands and Al Maktoum International Airport in Dubai. Satellite imagery from the satellite has also been used to monitor relief efforts during 2011 Tōhoku earthquake and tsunami in Japan. The images of the tsunami and earthquake-affected cities were provided to UN-SPIDER, the United Nations Platform for Space-based Information for Disaster Management and Emergency Response, and the Japan Aerospace Exploration Agency (JAXA). DubaiSat-1 completed its sixth year in orbit on 21 August 2015.

DubaiSat-2

DubaiSat-2, the second satellite launched by the Mohammed bin Rashid Space Centre, provides electro-optical images with advanced image resolution technology. The design and manufacturing of DubaiSat-2 was carried out by Emirati engineers along with their Korean counterparts. The DubaiSat-2 project started soon after the launch of DubaiSat-1, and the satellite was manufactured and launched in a much shorter period of time than that of the first satellite.

The satellite was all set for the launch at the beginning of November 2013, after passing a series of tests and it was then moved from South Korea to Russia under the supervision of top engineers.

DubaiSat-2 was launched on 21 November 2013 from the Yasny Launch Base in Russia, using the Russian Dnepr rocket launcher in cooperation with the Russian International Space Company (Kosmotras), under the supervision of a team of engineers from MBRSC. The speed of DubaiSat-2 was 7.55 km/s until it passed 600 km above the Earth. The communication link with DubaiSat-2 was established within an hour after separation from Dnepr rocket, and the satellite took its first image 24 hours after its launch, capturing Bani Yas Island in Abu Dhabi.

DubaiSat-2 provides high resolution images using a push-broom camera containing time delay integration sensors (TDI). The satellite is capable of providing satellite imagery in both panchromatic (spatial resolution of 1 m) and 4 multi-spectral bands (4 m) across an area of 12.2 km. It can store up to 17,000 km2 of image data, making it useful for a longer period of time.

DubaiSat-2 weighs around 300 kg, is 2 metres in height and 1 metre wide. The satellite contains an electrical propulsion system that controls its altitude above ground level and adjusts it automatically in case of any deviation from orbit. The satellite consists of two main segments: the Space segment which includes a spacecraft bus and an electro-optical payload containing push-broom camera with TDI sensors to provide space images, and the Ground segment consisting of the Main Mission Control Station (MCS), Main Image Receiving and Processing Station (IRPS), Subsidiary MCS, Antenna system and Customer.

DubaiSat-2 completed its second year in orbit around the earth in November 2015, and the satellite continues to provide electro-optical Earth images for various purposes including environmental monitoring, land and infrastructure planning, telecommunication and disaster management; serving both governmental and private organisations.

KhalifaSat 

KhalifaSat is the third satellite to be launched by the Mohammed bin Rashid Space Centre, and was scheduled for launch in 2018. This project represents the most technologically advanced satellite manufactured by MBRSC yet, and is being worked upon solely by Emirati engineers. Manufacturing of KhalifaSat is currently under progress in the clean room at MBRSC Headquarters in Dubai.

The completion of the KhalifaSat design, the critical design review, was announced in early January 2016. All the software and systems within the satellite have been completed and they have been reviewed for various purposes. The KhalifaSat team is now working on the flight model of the satellite and its processes related to ground station communication.

The KhalifaSat team has managed to incorporate several technologically advanced components in the satellite, including an enhanced light meter for the digital camera of the satellite that will provide better image resolution than DubaiSat-2, improved techniques for downloading images with faster speed from anywhere in the world, effective satellite positioning techniques that allow the capturing of larger number of 3D images. The target positioning system of the satellite has also been set to provide high quality images with high-speed response and an accurate location system. The satellite also includes an automatic satellite control system that has been done by upgrading the primary satellite computer's operating system and increasing its storage capacity.

The team of KhalifaSat includes 68 Emirati engineers and is led by Amer Mohammad Al Sayegh, Senior Director of the Space Systems Development Department who is serving as the Project Manager for KhalifaSat project. The team also includes Mohammed Abdul Rahim Al Harmi, Director of the Space Operations Department; Suhail Buti Al Dhafri, Senior Manager, Payload Electronics Department; Ahmed Salem Belal, Acting Manager, Satellites Electronics, and Omran Anwar Sharaf, Senior Director, Programmes Management Department.

KhalifaSat will provide high resolution images with a GSD of 0.7 m Panchromatic and multispectral bands of 4 m. These images will be made available for various commercial purposes, including disaster management, environmental monitoring and change detection. The satellite will have 320 Mbit/s speed of data transfer for image download. With 10 imaging sensors and 20 altitude sensors, KhalifaSat will orbit at a speed of 7.5 km/s in space.

Nayif-1 

Nayif-1 is the first ever CubeSat designed and manufactured by Emirati engineers, which was originally scheduled for launch in 2016, but delayed waiting for an appropriate SpaceX launch platform to be scheduled. The satellite was launched in February 2017 on the Indian Space Research Organisation PSLV-C37 launch vehicle, which established a world record by launching 104 satellites, the largest number of satellites deployed by a single launcher.

The name of the satellite is derived from the Arabic noun, which means "one that soars high above" or "one that is morally and intellectually superior". For the Nayif-1 project, MBRSC established a partnership with the American University of Sharjah (AUS) in order to provide the engineering students with hands-on experience in satellite manufacturing, testing and operations.

The Nayif-1 team consists of seven engineering students from the American University of Sharjah in electrical, mechanical and computer engineering disciplines. The satellite will be operated by these students, from the ground station to be built onsite at the American University of Sharjah.

With a dimension of 10×10×11.35 cm3 and a weight of 1.32 kg, the CubeSat will produce a communication footprint ranging from 5,000 to 5,500 km and it will orbit at a height between 450 km and 720 km for up to three years. The satellite will re-broadcast text messages to the world and it will collect data to help academic institutions in conducting different types of research.

Emirates Mars Mission 

The Emirates Mars Mission, also known as the Hope Mars Mission, is a mission aimed at sending an unmanned probe to Mars by 2021. The probe arrived in February 2021, which marks the 50th year since the founding of the United Arab Emirates.

The Emirates Mars Mission is the first ever space exploration mission to be carried out by the Arab World, and it is expected to drive the Middle East towards a new era of technological advancement. Mohammed bin Rashid Al Maktoum named the probe to Mars as the "Hope Probe" or "Al-Amal" in Arabic, as it carries the hopes for scientific development in the region. The launch window for the Hope Probe fell in July 2020, marking the point when Earth and Mars were aligned in their orbits around the Sun and were closest to one another. The probe successfully launched on July 19. The completion and launch of the Hope Probe by this time was crucial as the next alignment would not take place before two years after 2020.

Mohammed bin Rashid Al Maktoum stated that the Emirates Mars Mission sends three important messages to the world: "The first is for the world: that Arab civilization once played a great role in contributing to human knowledge and will play that role again. The second is to our Arab brethren: that nothing is impossible and that we can compete with the greatest of nations in the race for knowledge. The third is for those who strive to reach the highest of peaks: set no limits to your ambitions and you can even reach space".

The Hope Probe is compact and hexagonal in shape and structure, weighing around 1500 kg including fuel. The probe is 2.37 m wide and 2.90 m tall, the overall size being approximately equivalent to a small car. "Hope" will use three 600-watt solar panels to charge its batteries and it will communicate with Earth using a high-gain antenna with a 1.5 m wide dish. The spacecraft will also be equipped with star tracker sensors that will help determine its position in space by studying the constellations in relation to the Sun. Two sets of rocket thrusters and four to six large Delta-v thrusters, will control the speed of the probe and eight to 12 small Reaction Control System (RCS) thrusters will be responsible for the delicate maneuvering.

Upon arrival at Mars, it will study the atmosphere of Mars for two years. Its unique placement in orbit around Mars will provide a new type of data to build "the first truly holistic models" of the Martian atmosphere. The data is expected to provide reasons for the decay of the atmosphere to a level where it is now too thin to allow liquid water to exist. The Hope Probe will carry three scientific instruments to study the Martian atmosphere, which include a digital camera for high resolution coloured images, an infrared spectrometer that will examine the temperature patterns, ice, water vapors in the atmosphere, and an ultraviolet spectrometer that will study the upper atmosphere and traces of oxygen and hydrogen further out into space.

The Emirates Mars Mission team includes 150 Emirati engineers, with Omran Sharaf as the Project Manager; Sarah Amiri, Deputy Project Manager; Ibrahim Hamza Al Qasim, Deputy Project Manager, Strategic Planning, and Zakareyya Al Shamsi, Deputy Project Manager for the Emirates Mars Mission Operations.

The United Arab Emirates Space Agency and ISRO set up a joint working group regarding this mission in 2019.

Team and leadership 
MBRSC is headed by Director General, Yousuf Hamad Al Shaibani, who is responsible for all administrative and space project-related policies.

The centre's hierarchy is divided into two main sectors: the Scientific and Technical Affairs Sector, and the Administrative and Financial Sector. Both the sectors have their own objectives and policies. The team's structure follows a hierarchy defined to ensure that all strategic objectives are met with the highest level of excellence.

Salem Humaid Al Marri is Assistant Director General for Scientific and Technical Affairs while Mona Ahmed Al Qemzi is Assistant Director General for Administrative and Financial Affairs. Mohammed Abdul Rahim Al Harmi heads the Space Operation Department, Omran Sharaf heads the Programme Management Department and the Space Systems Development Department is headed by Amer Mohammad Al Sayegh.

UAE Astronaut Programme 
Following the launch of the UAE Astronaut Programme in late 2017, a national effort to select four full-time astronauts to train and rotate in a long-term effort to carry out scientific research in the International Space Station, 95 candidates were selected from over 4,022 applicants. Following psychometric, ability and medical assessments, these 95 candidates were whittled down to a group of 39, who were subjected to interviews and psychology tests. Of the 18 candidates who passed this phase who were interviewed by MBRSC and representatives of other agencies, nine final candidates passed through to the last stage of assessment.

Of these, two astronauts were announced in September 2018 - Hazza Al Mansouri and Sultan Al Neyadi. It was later announced that Al Mansouri will fly as the prime crew member, with Al Neyadi as his backup. He launched on 25 September 2019 on board Soyuz MS-15, and landed on Soyuz MS-12 on 3 October 2019.

It will be an eight-day stay on the International Space Station (ISS), where Al Mansouri will carry out several scientific experiments before his return on 3 October 2019. The UAE's first astronaut would be accompanied by Russian cosmonaut Oleg Skripochka and American astronaut Jessica Meir. Hazza Al Mansouri will receive a special menu with traditional Emirati dishes that would be prepared by Space Food Laboratory company.

On 26 August 2019, the Emirates announced that Al Mansoori will carry out 16 scientific experiments in cooperation with international space agencies. He has spent more than 1,400 hours on training and undertaken 90 courses within a year. It was also announced that the emirati astronaut has completed all pre-spaceflight medical experiments a month before the launch.

In September 2019, it was reported that the Emirati astronaut will carry 30 Al Ghaf tree seeds, along with the UAE flag on his space mission. The seeds were announced to be planted across the country after they are returned.

Facility 

The headquarters of Mohammed Bin Rashid Space Centre is located at Al Khawaneej, Dubai. The facility also includes a Clean Room for designing and manufacturing of various space satellites being worked upon by the MBRSC.

The facility includes a clean room which has been manufactured to ensure smooth execution of all satellite manufacturing projects and development of the Hope Probe. All the ongoing projects, including manufacturing of the earth observation satellites, including KhalifaSat and Nayif-1, along with development of Hope Probe, are carried out in the clean room by Emirati engineers.

Collaboration 
MBRSC is part of the Global Alliance of Earth Observation Satellites Operators – PanGeo. This is a collaboration between Dauria Aerospace (US/Russia), MBRSC (UAE), Elecnor Deimos (Spain) and Beijing Space Eye Innovation Technology (China). These four entities agreed to share the products, data and images derived from their satellites, as part of the PanGeo alliance.

The PanGeo fleet consists of nine satellites currently in orbit: Perseus-M1, Perseus-M2, DubaiSat-1, DubaiSat-2, Deimos-1, Deimos-2, Dauria-DX-1, TH-1-01 and TH-1-02. The fleet will be expanded to more than 30 satellites in the coming years with the launch of KhalifaSat, Perseus-O, Auriga and existing satellites from prospective new members.

Programmes and applications 
The Mohammed bin Rashid Space Centre launched the Advanced Aerial Systems Programme in September 2014. The programme is aimed at developing the capabilities of the UAE for designing, manufacturing and operating advanced aerial system.

The first project under the Advance Aerial Systems Programme was the development of a High Altitude Pseudo Satellite (HAPS) system in partnership with Airbus Defence and Space, one of the companies under the Airbus Group. With the use of highly advanced systems and materials, HAPS has demonstrated the ability to fly continuously for over two weeks, which is 10 times longer than any other Unmanned Aerial System (UAS) developed to date. The system provides a combination of the benefits of a satellite, in terms of altitude and applications, and an aircraft, in terms of re-usability and coverage.

The HAPS system has the ability to fly in the stratosphere at an altitude of 65,600 feet (20 km) above air traffic making it easier for different applications to work effectively. The use of the applications onboard HAPS include thermal imaging, full-HD video imaging (1080p), creation of temporary communication networks and the strengthening of navigation systems. The operational version of the aircraft is expected to go into service by the end of 2016.

MBRSC also created a "Super Resolution Tool" in May 2014. The tool has been developed by Saeed Al Mansoori, an engineer at MBRSC, and it has helped in improving the resolution of images taken by DubaiSat-1 and DubaiSat-2 by 0.75 metres. It helps in improving the details of the image when zoomed in by significantly increasing the number of pixels.

At the February 2017 World Government Summit, the United Arab Emirates announced a plan to establish a settlement on Mars by 2117, led by the Mohammed bin Rashid Space Centre.

Publication 
The official magazine of MBRSC is called "Majarat", which is published bi-monthly and focuses on spreading knowledge about space science and technology and inspiring a new generation of United Arab Emirates for a career in space science or scientific research. The magazine is published in both Arabic and English to cater for the cosmopolitan population in the UAE, and has featured a number of notable personalities from the global space industry, including Farouk El-Baz, Carolyn Porco, Steven Squyres, Frank Drake, Noureddine Melikechi and NASA astronaut Terry Virts.

Gallery
The following are some of the satellite images taken by DubaiSat-1:

See also

 United Arab Emirates Space Agency
 List of government space agencies
 List of United Arab Emirates Space Agency mission

References

External links
 MBRSC home page
 Official MBRSC Facebook page
 Official MBRSC Twitter page
 Official MBRSC Instagram page

 

Space program of the United Arab Emirates
Space agencies
Satellite meteorology
Satellite operators
Government agencies of Dubai